Daniel Morales Javier (August 6, 1947 – October 31, 2022), better known simply as Danny Javier, was a Filipino singer, composer, actor, television host and businessman. He was known as one of the members and lead vocalist of the popular musical trio APO Hiking Society along with Boboy Garrovillo and Jim Paredes, wherein he was the oldest of the group. Regarded as one of the pillars and icons of Original Pilipino Music (OPM).

Javier coined the term "OPM" (Original Pinoy Music, Original Philippine Music, Original Pilipino Music), originally referring to the Music of the Philippines and  Philippine pop songs, particularly ballads, and any musical composition created by a Filipino that became popular in the Philippines during the late '70s. The term continued to be used in following decades to refer to Filipino music popular in those decades.

Javier’s compositions include "Show Me A Smile" (1976), "Pag-ibig" (1978), "Lumang Tugtugin" (1978), "Pumapatak ang Ulan" (1978), "Kaibigan" (1978), "Doo Bidoo" (1978), "Kabilugan ng Buwan" (1980), "Princesa" (1980), "Blue Jeans" (1981), "Salawikain" (1982), "Kumot At Unan" (1983), "Di Na Natuto" (1985),  "Awit ng Barkada" (1991), "Just A Smile Away" (1992), "Isang Dangkal" (1999), and his last composition, "Lahat Tayo" (2022).

Career
Javier began his musical career in the late ’60s as part of a singing group named Danny, Mandy, and Alice, with Mandy Marquez and Alice Zerrudo. In 1970, Javier met Jim Paredes, Boboy Garrovillo, Ric Segreto, and 12 other original members of the Apolinario Mabini Hiking Society or known today as APO Hiking Society, and became the lead singer of the group. The group was formed and had its fledgling beginnings in 1969 at the Ateneo de Manila High School. After graduation, the majority of its members left to pursue individual careers, with only three members remaining, made up of Javier, Paredes, and Garrovillo.

In the span of their professional career, APO Hiking Society emerged as a principal adherent of the musical movement termed Original Pilipino Music (OPM), a term coined by Javier, a milieu in which their original musical contributions and cultural influence became essential. He became involved in record production, talent management and organizing artists under the Organisasyon ng Pilipinong Mang-aawit (O.P.M., acronym translation: "Organization of Philippine Singers/musicians"). The group expanded its activities into establishing and furthering the careers of new OPM artists in the Philippines.

As a television actor, Javier was part of different shows and movies such as Kung Mangarap Ka't Magising (1977), Kakabakaba Ka Ba? (1980), Blue Jeans (1981), and I Do Bidoo Bidoo: Heto nAPO Sila! (2012). Javier, with Paredes and Garrovillo, managed to host their own shows such as Sa Linggo nAPO Sila (They Are Now On Sunday), a Philippine musical-variety show that aired on ABS-CBN from November 6, 1988, to January 29, 1995, replaced by the first Talent Singing competition show Tawag ng Tanghalan from 1987–1988, and 'Sang Linggo nAPO Sila (They Are Now On All Week), a Philippine daily noon-time variety show of ABS-CBN that aired from January 28, 1995, to November 28, 1998, replacement of Eat Bulaga! and followed by Magandang Tanghali Bayan or MTB.

To date, the APO Hiking Society has released 27 albums and hundreds of songs over a career spanning four decades. Two hugely successful tribute albums were produced in 2006 and 2007 by its management group, featuring numerous young bands reinterpreting APO's expansive repertoire, included many hit songs such as "When I Met You", "Panalangin", "Batang-Bata Ka Pa", "Yakap Sa Dilim", "Pumapatak Ang Ulan", "Ewan", "Handong Ng Pilipino Sa Mundo",  "Awit Ng Barkada", "Mahirap Magmahal Ng Syota Ng Iba", "Paano", "Pag-ibig", "Nakapagtataka", "Di Na Natuto", "Show Me A Smile", "Blue Jeans", "Tuyo Na'ng Damdamin", "Kumot At Unan", "Kaibigan", "Sa'n Na Nga Ba'ng Barkada Ngayon", "Bawat Bata", "Princesa", "American Junk", "Lumang Tugtugin", "Salawikain",  "Doo Bidoo", and many among others.

In 2010, the APO Hiking Society, composed of Javier, Paredes, and Garrovillo decided to retire as a group after 41 years of activity. They performed a series of farewell concerts that started on February 14, 2010, and ended in May, just in time for the elections. In 2018, He retired from both singing and acting.

Personal life and death
Born in Abuyog, Leyte, Javier was the son of Leonardo "Andok" Javier Sr. of Leyte and brother of comedian George "Dyords" Javier, former actor turned photographer and government official Jimmy Javier, and former Javier, Leyte mayor and incumbent Leyte vice governor Leonardo "Sandy" Javier Jr., who also owns the Andok's Litson Corporation food chain. He attended San Beda University and Ateneo de Manila University. Singer-actress Mica Javier is his niece. Javier's son, Jobim, worked as a radio DJ at Jam 88.3 and as a stage theatre actor who was part of Eto Na! Musikal nAPO, a musical adaptation based on the first tribute album Kami nAPO Muna.

Javier also ventured in a T-shirt business called Pidro: Ang Saplot Ng Bayan, based on Pidro, a character he created about a man from the rural areas of the Philippines who came to Manila seeking good fortune. Pidro was selected as the official shirt of the Philippine Centennial celebrations in 1998.

After APO disbanded in 2010, Javier resided in General Santos and had been visiting the United States on a regular basis. Javier had a near-death experience in 2011 and was a survivor of kidney failure, pneumonia, emphysema, heart failure, hepatitis, diabetes and sepsis. He later became an advocate of moringa as a traditional and alternative medicine.

Javier openly supported the candidacy of Rodrigo Duterte in the 2016 Philippine presidential election while he supported Leni Robredo in the 2022 Philippine presidential election.

Javier died of complications due to a prolonged illness at the National Kidney and Transplant Institute on October 31, 2022, at the age of 75, as confirmed by his daughter Justine.

Selected filmography

Television
Tawag Ng Tahanan (ABS-CBN 2, 1988)
Islands Gamemasters (IBC 13, 1989)
Sa Linggo nAPO Sila (ABS-CBN 2, 1989–1995)
Sang Linggo nAPO Sila (ABS-CBN 2, 1995–1998)
Vilma On Seven (GMA 7, 1993)
Maynila (GMA 7, 2005)
Philippine Idol (ABC 5, now TV5, 2006)
Celebrity Duets Season 1 (GMA 7, 2007) - performer
Pinoy Idol (GMA 7, 2008)
Talentadong Pinoy (TV5, 2009) - judge
It's Showtime (ABS-CBN 2, 2010) - guest celebrity judge
Bangis (TV5, 2011)
Power House (GMA News TV 11,  2012)
News Cafe (9TV, 2013)
Tunay Na Buhay (GMA 7, 2013)
ASOP: A Song Of Praise Season 3 (UNTV 37, 2014) - guest judge
Matanglawin (ABS-CBN 2, 2014)
Boys Ride Out! (CNN Philippines 9, 2015)
Aha! (GMA 7, 2015)
Sabado Badoo (GMA 7, 2015) - cameo featured footage
Gandang Gabi Vice (ABS-CBN 2, 2015)
Tonight With Boy Abunda (ABS-CBN 2, 2016)
Family Feud (ABS-CBN 2, 2016)
Full House Tonight (GMA 7, 2016)
Sunday Pinasaya (GMA 7, 2017)

See also
APO Hiking Society
Jim Paredes
Boboy Garrovillo

References

External links

 

1947 births
2022 deaths
Filipino OPM composers
20th-century Filipino male singers
Filipino songwriters
Manila sound musicians
APO Hiking Society members
Filipino male television actors
Filipino television variety show hosts
Musicians from Leyte (province)
People from General Santos